Fabian van Olphen (born 30 March 1981) is a Dutch retired handball player who last played for TBV Lemgo and the Netherlands national team.

References

Living people
1981 births
Dutch male handball players